Conus vicweei, common name the Vic Wee's cone, is a species of sea snail, a marine gastropod mollusk in the family Conidae, the cone snails and their allies.

Like all species within the genus Conus, these snails are predatory and venomous. They are capable of "stinging" humans, therefore live ones should be handled carefully or not at all.

Description
The colour is referred to as violet brown, with white to cream zigzag shaped lines reducing towards the lip and on the ventral side.

Distribution
This marine species occurs off Burma, in the Strait of Malacca, off India in the Lakshadweep Sea, and off Indonesia.

References

External links
 The Conus Biodiversity website
 Cone Shells – Knights of the Sea
 

vicweei
Gastropods described in 1973